Amphizoa striata is a species of trout-stream beetle in the family Amphizoidae. It is found in North America. It is between 13 and 15 millimeters long. Its front tarsi have a well-developed groove on the posterior surface and grooves bearing a fringe of long hair-like setae. It lives in British Columbia, Oregon, and Washington.

References

Further reading

 
 
 

Adephaga
Articles created by Qbugbot
Beetles described in 1927